Gilmore Tilmen Schjeldahl (June 1, 1912March 10, 2002) was an American businessman and inventor in plastics, adhesives and circuitry. He was awarded 16 US patents and may be best known for inventing the plastic-lined airsickness bag.

Biography

Early life and education
Gilmore Tilmen Schjeldahl was born in Esmond, North Dakota, to Norwegian immigrants. His father was a railroad worker. He grew up in Northwood, North Dakota, and did not graduate from high school, but took courses at North Dakota State College of Science and North Dakota State University before being drafted into the U.S. Army to serve during World War II. Schjeldahl served in three battles with the 84th Division, including the Battle of the Bulge, in which his actions were awarded with a Bronze Star.

Career
Schjeldahl began his career at Armour and Company, where he began working with polyethylene. Unable to get the material to seal to itself, he and his wife experimented on solutions at home, where they developed a hot knife-sealing process. He left Armour in 1946 and moved to Minneapolis, where he created a bag-making machine in his home. He used the machine to launch his first company, Herb-Shelly, Inc., in 1948. The company moved into a shop the next year in Farmington, Minnesota, and eventually produced a variety of polyethylene packaging materials and plastic bag liners. By 1954, the company had $500,000 annual sales and 100 employees. The company started experimenting with lamination at this time, researching adhesives for a new DuPont polymer called Mylar. The company was also involved in the fabrication of a balloon for the Office of Naval Research at the University of Minnesota. In May 1954, Herb-Shelly was acquired by Brown & Bigelow. Schjeldahl resigned and left the company on January 8, 1955.

On January 21, 1955, Schjeldahl began making plans for a new company to be located in the basement of the Medical Arts building in Northfield, Minnesota. The company secured a contract in April 1955 to create atmospheric research balloons made with Mylar polyester film, held together with an adhesive system that Schjeldahl developed. On September 1, 1955, the G.T. Schjeldahl Company went public. In addition to balloons, the company manufactured bag-making machines and heat-sealing adhesive tape. Eventually the company began developing a line of adhesive tapes for polyester bonding called Schjel-Bond (GT100, GT200, GT300, and GT400).

The G. T. Schjeldahl Company gained national recognition for designing and building Echo I, the first communications satellite. The Schjeldahl Company worked on both the Echo II, Stargazer, and Stratascope II projects. The company also made the laminate and adhesive materials for the Polaris missile program. These environmental seals, which were called diaphragms, kept water out of the submarine until a missile was released. G. T. Schjeldahl Company products and technology using vacuum deposition and lamination were used on the Pegasus satellite program, putting the company into the vacuum deposition business.

The weakening economy in 1967 lead to a decrease in government supported research. Schjeldahl resigned as Chairman of the Board and started Giltech, a company which concerned itself primarily with making bottles through the blow molding process. The Giltech Company merged with another plastics company, Rainville in 1972 to become Rainville, Inc. Eventually Rainville, Inc. merged with, and became, Universal Dynamics (UnaDyn). In 1970, Schjeldahl also created the Plastic Netting Machine Company. This company developed and produced devices for feeding and filling rigid plastic containers. The name of the company was changed to Sheldahl, Inc. in 1974 for ease of pronunciation and spelling.

In 1978, Schjeldahl suffered a mild heart attack. During his recovery, he pondered techniques for opening up blocked arteries. This led to another business venture, the Cathedyne Corporation. Schjeldahl worked with his cardiologist on improving coronary angioplasty catheters. The Cathedyne Corporation was sold to Angiomedics, Inc., a subsidiary of Pfizer, in 1983.

In 2000, Sheldahl, Inc. merged with International Flex Technologies, headquartered in New York. In 2004, Sheldahl was purchased by the Multek Corporation.

Marriage and children
Gilmore and Charlene Hanson Schjeldahl were married for 61 years and had five children: Peter, Don, Ann, Peggy and Mary.

Death and afterward
Schjeldahl died on March 10, 2002, at his home in Lenox, Massachusetts, after battling Alzheimer's disease for many years.

His business records are archived at the Elwyn B. Robinson Department of Special Collections at the University of North Dakota.

Photographs, Sheldahl, Inc. business records, and other materials related to his business in Northfield, MN are held at the Northfield Historical Society.

Awards
1962: Alumni Achievement Award, North Dakota State University
1970: honorary D.Sc., North Dakota State University
1988 : inductee, North Dakota Entrepreneur Hall of Fame 
1991: inductee, the Scandinavian-American Hall of Fame
1993: honorary doctorate, University of North Dakota

References

Further reading

External links
Schjeldahl Entrepreneur Collection

1912 births
2002 deaths
Deaths from Alzheimer's disease
North Dakota State University alumni
American people of Norwegian descent
People from Grand Forks County, North Dakota
Military personnel from North Dakota
North Dakota State College of Science alumni
20th-century American inventors